Feline Resurrection is the compilation album of Jessica Sutta under the name J Sutta. It was released for free download (via her own website) song by song every Friday from April 8 to June 9, 2016, starting with the track "I Tried" with a total of 17 songs. The album was conformed of discards from her next and official album I Say Yes.

Promotional singles 
The first single related with this album was the song "Candy", released in 2014, the video appeared on Sutta’s YouTube channel on November 20, 2014. "Bottle Bitch" was the second song related with the album, it was released in January 2015 with two versions, the original and an EP with remixes, the video was released on Sutta's channel until May 27, 2016.

The third single was "Let It Be Love" featuring Rico Love, released earlier 2015, with two music videos, the first was released on June 24, 2015, and the second on July 9, 2016 featuring the “Tommy Love Big Room Club Mix” version. The song peaked at number 6 on US Dance Club Songs chart.

"Feline Resurrection" was the next single, this was her first song released under the name J Sutta. The video was released on October 9, 2015 as a short film with (apparently) some references to Robin Antin and the Pussycat Dolls. The last single of the album was “Damn! (I Wish I Was Your Lover)”, a cover of the 1992 song by the American singer Sophie B. Hawkins, the video was released at the end of 2015 and features Sutta with an obsessive crush on another woman.

Track listing

References

2016 debut albums